Jock Jams, Volume 3 was the third album in the Jock Jams compilation album series.

It contained the single "The Jock Jam" (or "ESPN Presents the Jock Jam"), which peaked at #31 on the U.S. Billboard Hot 100 and was certified gold by the RIAA for sales of over 500,000 copies.

Track listing
"It's Awesome Baby!" – Dick Vitale
"Tribal Dance" - 2 Unlimited
"Ready to Go" – Republica
"I Like It Like That" – Tito Nieves
"C'mon N' Ride It (The Train)" – Quad City DJ's
"Let's Go" – The Jock Jams Cheerleaders
"Da' Dip" – Freak Nasty
"Jump!" – The Movement
"R.O.W.D.I.E." – The Jock Jams Cheerleaders
"Jellyhead" – Crush
"No Diggity" – BLACKstreet featuring Dr. Dre
"The Chant" – The Jock Jams Cheerleaders
"Let Me Clear My Throat" – DJ Kool
"That's the Way (I Like It)" – KC & The Sunshine Band
"Supersonic" – Sabrina Sang
"Fired Up!" – Funky Green Dogs
"Robi Rob's Boriqua Anthem" – C+C Music Factory
"Don't Stop Movin'" – Livin' Joy 
"Don't Stop, Get It, Get It!!" – The Jock Jams Cheerleaders
"Cotton Eye Joe" – Rednex
"The Jock Jam Mega Mix" 
"The Chicken Dance" – Ray Castoldi

Charts

Weekly charts

Year-end charts

References

Jock series
1997 compilation albums
Dance music compilation albums
Tommy Boy Records compilation albums